Bertram Schäfer (born 18 March 1946, in Bitburg) is a German racing driver. He won the German Formula Three Championship in 1976 and 1978. He also raced at the Norisring for one round of the Volkswagen Scirocco R-Cup in 2010.

Bertram Schafer became the owner of Bertram Schafer Racing, a successful European F3 Championship team. In 2002, he was one of the judges at Red Bull’s Formula One Driver Search program.

References

External links
 Official website
 Career statistics from Driver Database

1946 births
Living people
German racing drivers
People from Bitburg
Racing drivers from Rhineland-Palatinate